Rock 'n Roll Nightmare is an album by hardcore punk band Rich Kids on LSD, released in 1987. It was re-mastered and re-released in 1993 on Epitaph Records. The original release on Alchemy Records included a 32-page comic and lyric book drawn by Dan Sites.

Andrew Kiraly, writing for the Las Vegas Mercury, comedically gave this album the award "Best Album of 1987 I Found While Digging in My Desk Which I'm Surprised Hasn't Been 'Rediscovered' By Critics and Hailed Anew As a Masterpiece, or Maybe I'm Just Feeling Stupid and Nostalgic".

Track listing

Credits

References

1987 albums
Rich Kids on LSD albums